Ramsay is a Scottish surname. Notable people with the surname include:

Alan Ramsay (1895–1973), Australian army officer
Alana Ramsay (born 1994), Canadian alpine skier
Alex Ramsay (1899–1957), English footballer
Alexander Ramsay (disambiguation)
Ali Ramsay, Scottish cricketer
Alison Ramsay (born 1959), Scottish hockey international
Allan Ramsay (disambiguation)
Andrew Ramsay (disambiguation)
Archibald Maule Ramsay (1894–1955), British Army officer and politician
Bertram Ramsay (1883–1945), British admiral
Bill Ramsay (William G. Ramsay, born 1929), American jazz saxophonist and band leader
Bill Ramsay (athlete) (1928–1988), Australian middle-distance runner
Bill Ramsay (politician) (born 1962), politician in Newfoundland, Canada
Bob Ramsay (footballer) (1864–?), English footballer
Chris Ramsay, American magician and YouTuber
Connie Ramsay (born 1988), Scottish judoka
Dave Ramsay (born 1970), Canadian politician in the Northwest Territories
David Ramsay (disambiguation)
Derek Ramsay (born 1976), British-Filipino model, TV host and actor
Diana Ramsay (1926–2017), co-founder of the James and Diana Ramsay Foundation in South Australia
Ebba Ramsay (1828–1922), Swedish social worker, writer, and translator
Edward Ramsay (1793–1872), Scottish Episcopalian clergyman and dean
Edward Pierson Ramsay (1842–1916), Australian zoologist
Eileen Ramsay (1915-2017), British maritime photographer
Ernest Pringle Ramsay (1870–1952), Australian posts and telegraph director
Francis Dennis Ramsay (1925–2009), Scottish painter
Francis Munroe Ramsay (1835–1914), US Navy Officer and Chief of Bureau of Navigation
Francis Ramsay (cricketer) (1860–1947), English cricketer and pastoralist in Queensland
Frank William Ramsay, (1875–1954), British Army major general in the First World War
George Ramsay (disambiguation)
Gordon Ramsay (disambiguation)
Heath Ramsay (born 1981), Australian butterfly swimmer
Henrik Ramsay (1886–1951), Finnish politician and minister of foreign affairs
Henry Ramsay (Indian Army officer) (1816–1893), general in the Indian Army, Commissioner of the Kumaon and Garhwal districts
Henry Ramsay (civil engineer) (1808–1886), American civil engineer
Ian Ramsay (born 1958), law professor at the University of Melbourne
Jack Ramsay (1925–2014), American college basketball coach
James Ramsay (disambiguation)
Jamie D. Ramsay, South African cinematographer
Jim Ramsay (1930–2013), Australian politician
John Ramsay (disambiguation)
Josh Ramsay (born 1985), Canadian musician
Mark Ramsay (born 1986), Scottish footballer
Mark F. Ramsay (born c. 1958), United States Air Force general
Tilly Ramsay, Anglo-Scottish TV presenter, daughter of Gordon Ramsay
Meta Ramsay (born 1936), Labour life peer
Michèle Ramsay, South Africa geneticist
Morton Ramsay (1926–1983), Scottish footballer
Paul Ramsay (1936–2014), Australian businessman and philanthropist
Paul Ramsay (British philanthropist) (born 1953), philanthropist
Peter de Ramsay (died 1256), Bishop of Aberdeen
Peter Ramsay (1939–2019), New Zealand academic
Richie Ramsay (born 1983), Scottish golf international
Robert Ramsay (disambiguation)
Scott Ramsay (footballer) (born 1980), English footballer
Shyam Ramsay (born 1952), Bollywood film director
Silas Alexander Ramsay (1850–1942), mayor of Calgary, Alberta, Canada
Tulsi Ramsay (born 1944), film director
Walter C. Ramsay (1878–1928), American politician and newspaper editor
Wilhelm Ramsay (1865–1928), Finnish geologist
William Ramsay (disambiguation)

See also
Fox Maule-Ramsay, 11th Earl of Dalhousie (1801–1874), British political leader
Clan Ramsay
Ramsey (surname)

References

Scottish surnames
Surnames of Lowland Scottish origin
English-language surnames